Fidei may refer to :

 Asaphocrita fidei, a moth endemic to Costa Rica
 Fideism, a theory which maintains that faith is independent of reason

See also

 Fidei defensor ("Defender of the Faith"), part of the full style of many monarchs since the early 16th century
Mysterium fidei (disambiguation)
 Fides (disambiguation)
 Fide (disambiguation)
 
 Sensus fidelium, a sense of faith among religious people
 Uberrima fides (utmost good faith), a legal doctrine which governs insurance contracts
 Rule of Faith (regula fidei or analogia fidei), an element of some Christian teachings